Alvin Haynes (born 6 June 1968) is a Barbadian athlete. He competed in the men's triple jump at the 1992 Summer Olympics.

References

1968 births
Living people
Athletes (track and field) at the 1992 Summer Olympics
Barbadian male triple jumpers
Olympic athletes of Barbados
Place of birth missing (living people)